Pieris ergane, the  mountain small white, is a butterfly of the  family Pieridae. It is found in Southern Europe, Asia Minor, Syria, Iraq, Iran and  Transcaucasia.

The length of the forewings is 19–24 mm. Adults are on wing from April to September in two to three generations

The larvae feed on Aethionema saxatile and Aethionema orbiculatum.

External links
LepsIt

ergane
Butterflies described in 1828
Butterflies of Asia
Butterflies of Europe